The Nemzeti Bajnokság ("National Championship"), also known as NB I, is the top level of the Hungarian football league system. The league is officially named OTP Bank Liga after its title sponsor OTP Bank. UEFA currently ranks the league 28th in Europe.

Twelve teams compete in the league, playing each other three times, once at home, once away, and the third match is played at the stadium that the last match was not played at. At the end of the season, the top team enters the qualification for the UEFA Champions League, while the runner-up and the third place, together with the winner of the Magyar Kupa enter the UEFA Europa Conference League qualification rounds. The bottom two clubs are relegated to Nemzeti Bajnokság II, the second-level league, to be replaced by the winner and the runner up of the NB2.

History

The first championship in 1901 was contested by BTC, MUE, FTC, Műegyetemi AFC, and Budapesti SC, with the latter winning the championship. Although the two first championships were won by Budapesti TC, the other titles that decade were won by FTC and MTK.

In the 1910s and 1920s, the championship was dominated by Ferencváros and MTK.

In the 1930s, the rivalry between Ferencváros and MTK Budapest expanded with another club, Újpest FC (at that time not part of Budapest). One of the most iconic figures of the 1930s Hungarian football was Újpest's Zsengellér who managed to top goalscorer three times in a row in the 1930s. Ferencváros's Sárosi and MTK Budapest's Cseh and Újpest's Zsengellér were the embodiment of the rivalry of the three clubs from Budapest, named Budapest derby.

In the 1940s, Csepel could win its first title which was followed by two other titles in 1942 and 1943. During the World War II, there were no interruptions in the Hungarian league. Due to the expansion of the territories of the country, new clubs could re-join the league such as Nagyvárad and Kolozsvár. The second half of the 1940s was dominated by Újpest by winning the championship in 1945, 1946, and 1947.

In the 1950s, the dominance of Ferencváros and MTK weakened by the emergence of Honvéd with players such as Puskás, Bozsik, Czibor, and Budai. Later these players played in the final of the 1954 FIFA World Cup. In the 1950s, Honvéd could win the championship five times. During the early 1950s, Honvéd players formed the backbone of the legendary Mighty Magyars. In 1956, the Hungarian league was suspended due to the Hungarian Revolution. The league was led by Honvéd after 21 rounds but the championship has never been finished.
In the first season (1955–56) of the European Cup, MTK Budapest reached the quarter-finals while in the 1957–58 season Vasas Budapest played in the semi-finals of the European Cup.

Vasas won four titles in the 1960s (1960/61, 1961/62, 1965, and 1966).

Ujpest dominated the 1970s, winning seven titles.

In 1982, Győr won the championship becoming the first non-Budapest team who could win the Hungarian league (except Nagyvárad during the World War II). Győr could repeat the triumph in the following year in 1983. However, the 1980s was dominated by Honvéd who celebrated its second heyday during the 1980s.

Due to the collapse of communism, Hungarian football clubs lost the support of the state. Therefore, many clubs were faced with financial problems the effects of which are still present in Hungarian football. However, the 1990s were still dominated by the 'traditional' clubs of the championships such as Ferencváros, MTK and Újpest. Ferencváros always finished in the top three, except for the 1993–94 season, when they finished 4th. The financial problems affected the performance of the clubs outside the Hungarian League as well. Hungarian clubs could not compete with their European counterparts. Moreover, the Bosman ruling also had a deep impact on the Hungarian League. Since big European clubs could invest loads of money into football, clubs from the Eastern Bloc were restricted to employing only home nationals.

In the 2000s, new clubs became champions, mainly from rural Hungary. In 2002, Bozsik's Zalaegerszeg won the championship. Debrecen won the Hungarian league in 2005, 2006, 2007, 2009, and 2010. In 2008 MTK could win.

The dominance of the rural clubs continued in the 2010s. In 2011 and 2015, Székesfehérvár's Videoton won the championship. In 2013, Győr and in 2014, Debrecen could win the Hungarian League title.

Current clubs 
As of the 2022–23 season, there are twelve clubs in the division, who play each other three times for a total of 33 games each. The bottom two clubs are relegated.

Champions 

 1901: BTC
 1902: BTC (2)
 1903: Ferencváros
 1904: MTK
 1905: Ferencváros (2)
 1906–07: Ferencváros (3)
 1907–08: MTK (2)
 1908–09: Ferencváros (4)
 1909–10: Ferencváros (5)
 1910–11: Ferencváros (6)
 1911–12: Ferencváros (7)
 1912–13: Ferencváros (8)
 1913–14: MTK (3)
 1914-16 – Unofficial championships
 1916–17: MTK (4)
 1917–18: MTK (5)
 1918–19: MTK (6)
 1919–20: MTK (7)
 1920–21: MTK (8)
 1921–22: MTK (9)
 1922–23: MTK (10)
 1923–24: MTK (11)
 1924–25: MTK (12)
 1925–26: Ferencváros (9)
 1926–27: Ferencváros (10)
 1927–28: Ferencváros (11)
 1928–29: MTK (as Hungária) (13)
 1929–30: Újpest
 1930–31: Újpest (2)
 1931–32: Ferencváros (12)
 1932–33: Újpest (3)
 1933–34: Ferencváros (13)
 1934–35: Újpest (4)
 1935–36: MTK (as Hungária) (14)

 1936–37: MTK (as Hungária) (15)
 1937–38: Ferencváros (14)
 1938–39: Újpest (5)
 1939–40: Ferencváros (15)
 1940–41: Ferencváros (16)
 1941–42: Csepel
 1942–43: Csepel (2)
 1943–44: Nagyvárad
 1944 – unofficial championship
 1945: Újpest (6)
 1945–46: Újpest (7)
 1946–47: Újpest (8)
 1947–48: Csepel (3)
 1948–49: Ferencváros (17)
 1949–50: Honvéd
 1950: Honvéd (2)
 1951: MTK (as Bástya) (16)
 1952: Honvéd (3)
 1953: MTK (as Vörös Lobogó) (17)
 1954: Honvéd (4)
 1955: Honvéd (5)
 1956 – abandoned due to Revolution
 1957: Vasas
 1957–58: MTK (18)
 1958–59: Csepel (4)
 1959–60: Újpest (as Dózsa) (9)
 1960–61: Vasas (2)
 1961–62: Vasas (3)
 1962–63: Ferencváros (18)
 1963: Győr (as Győri Vasas ETO)
 1964: Ferencváros (19)
 1965: Vasas (4)
 1966: Vasas (5)

 1967: Ferencváros (20)
 1968: Ferencváros (21)
 1969: Újpest (as Dózsa) (10)
 1970: Újpest (as Dózsa) (11)
 1970–71: Újpest (as Dózsa) (12)
 1971–72: Újpest (as Dózsa) (13)
 1972–73: Újpest (as Dózsa) (14)
 1973–74: Újpest (as Dózsa) (15)
 1974–75: Újpest (as Dózsa) (16)
 1975–76: Ferencváros (22)
 1976–77: Vasas (6)
 1977–78: Újpest (as Dózsa) (17)
 1978–79: Újpest (as Dózsa) (18)
 1979–80: Honvéd (6)
 1980–81: Ferencváros (23)
 1981–82: Győr (as ETO Győr) (2)
 1982–83: Győr (as ETO Győr) (3)
 1983–84: Honvéd (7)
 1984–85: Honvéd (8)
 1985–86: Honvéd (9)
 1986–87: MTK (as MTK-VM) (19)
 1987–88: Honvéd (10)
 1988–89: Honvéd (11)
 1989–90: Újpest (as Dózsa) (19)
 1990–91: Honvéd (12)
 1991–92: Ferencváros (24)
 1992–93: Honvéd (as Kispest) (13)
 1993–94: Vác
 1994–95: Ferencváros (25)
 1995–96: Ferencváros (26)
 1996–97: MTK (20)
 1997–98: Újpest (20)
 1998–99: MTK (21)
 1999–2000: Dunaújváros (as Dunaferr)

 2000–01: Ferencváros (27)
 2001–02: Zalaegerszeg
 2002–03: MTK (as MTK-Hungária) (22)
 2003–04: Ferencváros (28)
 2004–05: Debrecen
 2005–06: Debrecen (2)
 2006–07: Debrecen (3)
 2007–08: MTK (23)
 2008–09: Debrecen (4)
 2009–10: Debrecen (5)
 2010–11: Fehérvár (as Videoton)
 2011–12: Debrecen (6)
 2012–13: Győr (4)
 2013–14: Debrecen (7)
 2014–15: Fehérvár (as Videoton) (2)
 2015–16: Ferencváros (29)
 2016–17: Honvéd (14)
 2017–18: Fehérvár (as Videoton) (3)
 2018–19: Ferencváros (30)
 2019–20: Ferencváros (31)
 2020–21: Ferencváros (32)
 2021–22: Ferencváros (33)

Notes
1901–26: Amateur era
1901–08: Teams only from Budapest took part
1914–15: Cancelled due to war but from 1916 to 1918/19 war championships operated and are recognized by the FA.
1926: The professional league was introduced with 10 participants also from other cities than Budapest, like Szombathely, Szeged etc.
1935: The first National Championship was held. (Nemzeti Bajnokság, NB) 14 teams.
1940: Hungária (MTK) was banned by the fascist government. During the war, teams from the neighboring countries participated, since the territories were adjoined to Hungary, which is how Nagyvarad became champions that year.
1944: It was abandoned due to war.
1945: New Nemzeti Bajnokság I starts.
1956–57: Abandoned due to revolution.

Name changes
Honvéd: (Kispest)
Csepel: 1912 CSTK, 1932 Csepel FC, 1937 Weizs Manfréd FC, 1945 CSMTK, 1946 Cs. Vasas, 1957, Csepel SC)
Ferencváros: (1899 FTC, 1926 Ferencváros, 1949 EDOSZ, 1951 Bp. Kinizsi, 1957 Ferencváros)
MTK: 1883 MTK, 1926 Hungária, 1945 MTK, 1949 Textiles, 1951 Bp. Bástya, 1953 Vörös Lobogó, 1957 MTK, 1974 MTK-VM, 1991 MTK, 1997 MTK Hungária)
Újpest: 1885 ÚTE, 1926 Újpest, 1949 Bp. Dózsa, 1957 Újpesti Dózsa, 1991 ÚTE, 2000 Újpesti FC)
Fehérvár: Videoton, MOL Vidi FC
Győr: Győri ETO

Most titles
Below is a ranking of the clubs by most titles won.

Notes:
† Dissolved before World War II
‡ Team from Oradea, which is now located in Romania 
 * Includes Rába Vasas ETO Győr, Győri Vasas ETO

Most seasons 
The following clubs have spent more than 50 seasons in the Nemzeti Bajnokság I. Clubs in bold compete in the 2021–22 season.

For a complete list see: Most seasons

Top scorers

All time top scorers
As of July 2021.

Players

One of the most notable players of the Hungarian League was Ferenc Puskás who played for Honvéd. He played for Honvéd from 1943 to 1955 and then for Real Madrid. He made his first senior appearance for Kispest in November 1943 in a match against Nagyváradi AC.

Statistics

UEFA coefficients

The following data indicates Hungarian coefficient rankings between European football leagues.

Country ranking
UEFA League Ranking 2017-2022 period:

 25.  (25)  Liga I (17.150)
 26.  (26)  Azerbaijan Premier League (17.000)
 27.  (28)  Nemzeti Bajnokság I (16.375)
 28.  (30)  Ekstraklasa (15.875)
 29.  (27)  Kazakhstan Premier League (15.750)

Club ranking
UEFA 5-year Club Ranking after 2021/22 season:
  99.  Ferencváros (15.500)
 122.  Fehérvár (11.500)
 233.  Honvéd (5.500)
 301.  Újpest (3.500)
 314.  Puskás Akadémia (3.275)
 315.  Debrecen (3.275)
 316.  Vasas SC (3.275)

Attendance
Attendances reached peaks in 1955 and 1957.

The record for highest average home attendance for a club was set by Budapest Kinizsi in 1955 (49,077 over 13 home matches). 27 March 1955 saw the record for highest attendance at a match, with 98,000 in the game between Honvéd and Budapest Kinizsi at Ferenc Puskás Stadium. The highest ever average attendance for NB I as a whole was set in 1955 with 17,151.

 In the 2019/20 season 198 games were played, but only 160 were played without COVID-19 limitations. 
554,741 tickets were sold for 160 games without crowd limitations – season's average 3,467 per game.
599,676 tickets were sold for all 198 games – season's average 3,029 per game, not including 8 games behind close doors, 190 games – season's average 3,156 per game.

See also

 Football in Hungary
List of international football players playing in Hungary
List of Nemzeti Bajnokság I clubs
List of Nemzeti Bajnokság I managers
List of Nemzeti Bajnokság I stadiums
Hungarian football clubs in European competitions
Nemzeti Bajnokság II
Nemzeti Bajnokság III

References

External links 
 Hungarian football league 
 League at UEFA
 NB I current season results and table at Soccerway
 Hungary league tables overview page at RSSSF
 List of current NB 1 clubs at magyarfutball.hu
 Hungarian Football Page
 League champions and runners-up at Nemzeti sport 

 
Hungary
1901 establishments in Hungary
1
Professional sports leagues in Hungary